A Gizmotchy is an antenna developed in the early 1960s for citizens band radio by the Utica Radio Corporation. In the mid-1960s the patent was acquired by the Charles Radio Company and the antenna is now marketed as the Charles Gizmotchy.

The Gizmotchy is a variation of the Yagi. Each element consists of three rods arranged 120 degrees apart in an inverted "Y" configuration. The driven element is essentially a three-part dipole. One of these rods is the vertical driven rod, and one is the horizontal driven rod. The third rod is what would be the other half of a regular dipole and points downward 120 degrees from vertical on the opposite side of the support pole from the downward-pointing driven rod. The other elements are parasitic radiators like those of a Yagi except consisting of inverted "Y"s.

Like the Yagi, the Gizmotchy is a directional antenna with a forward gain of approximately 12 dBi and a front-to-back ratio of 28 dB. The unique design of the Gizmotchy allows both vertical or horizontal polarization, through the use of separate gamma matches and transmission lines.

See also
 Antenna (radio)
 Yagi antenna
 Turnstile antenna

References

Radio frequency antenna types
Antennas (radio)
Citizens band radio